Beautiful Thing is the fourth studio album by British musician Alexis Taylor. It was released on 20 April 2018, under Domino Recording Company.

The album was produced by Tim Goldsworthy.

Singles
On 22 March 2018, Alexis released the single "Oh Baby". It was produced by Joe Goddard, and features Alexis' Hot Chip band members.

Alexis Taylor said of the single: "[Oh Baby] is an exuberant love song, with a nod to the music I love by the likes of Alex Chilton and Paul McCartney. It was produced by Joe Goddard and features John Coxon on guitar and some Hot Chip bandmembers playing on it too. I wrote it in about the time it takes to listen to it, and the finished performance was recorded live in the studio.

Critical reception

Beautiful Thing was met with "generally favorable" reviews from critics. At Metacritic, which assigns a weighted average rating out of 100 to reviews from mainstream publications, this release received an average score of 71, based on 20 reviews. Aggregator Album of the Year gave the release a 71 out of 100 based on a critical consensus of 20 reviews.

Track listing

Personnel

Musicians
 Alexis Taylor – lead vocalist, drums, guitar, piano
 Charles Ballas – synthesizer
 Al Doyle – bass
 Terry Edwards – trumpet
 John Coxon – guitar
 Neil Hagerty – backing vocals, guitar
 Sarah Jones – drums
 Rob Smoughton – drums
 Leo Taylor – drums
 Prudence Taylor – backing vocals
 Susumu Mukai – ebo

Production
 Charles Ballas – engineer
 Tim Goldsworthy – producer, engineer
 Bruno Ellingham – engineer, mixer
 Shuta Shinoda – engineer
 Alex Wharton – mastering

References

External links
 
 

2018 albums
Domino Recording Company albums
Alexis Taylor albums